Al Pratt is a fictional character appearing in American comic books published by DC Comics. He is the first character to use the name Atom. He initially had no superpowers and was originally a diminutive college student and later a physicist, usually depicted as a "tough-guy" character. Al Pratt is also the father of Damage and the godfather of Atom Smasher.

The character made his live-action debut in the television series Smallville, played by Glenn Hoffman. Henry Winkler cameoed as the character in the DC Extended Universe film Black Adam (2022).

Publication history
The Atom first appeared in All-American Comics #19 (October 1940) and was created by writer Bill O'Connor and artist Ben Flinton. The character continued to appear on and off through issue #72 (April 1946). In 1947, the Atom moved from All-American Comics to Flash Comics with issue #80 (February 1947), and continued until issue #104 (February 1949).

In winter 1940, the Atom also began appearing in All Star Comics as a member of the Justice Society of America, beginning with issue #3. He continued with that team until issue #57 (February 1951).

Fictional character biography

Golden Age
Initially a proverbial 98-pound weakling, bullied at school and unable to impress the girl of his dreams, Mary James, the  Al Pratt was trained to fighting condition by ex-boxer Joe Morgan (the same man who trained Pratt's fellow mystery men Wildcat and the Guardian). Pratt soon became a founding member of the Justice Society of America, appearing in the team's various stories during their original Golden Age appearances. In All Star Comics #3 (Winter 1940), the Atom describes himself to his fellow JSAers as "Al Pratt, a quiet sophomore at Calvin College". He later became a founding and active member of the All-Star Squadron. During World War II, Pratt served as a tank driver for the United States Army.

According to Jess Nevins' Encyclopedia of Golden Age Superheroes, the Atom "fights the Emperor of America, agents of the Black Dragon Society, and the Carnival of Crime, in addition to the Cootie Gang, Mandini the Magician and the scavenger Undersea Raiders".

In 1948, the Atom gained super strength as a result of the latent effects of his 1942 battle with the reluctant supervillain Cyclotron (after whose costume Pratt redesigned his own). It was later revealed that he had taken partial custodianship of Cyclotron's daughter, Terri.

Pratt's last Golden Age appearance was in All Star Comics #57 in 1951, also the last Golden Age Justice Society story. Later it was revealed that a special Senate investigation panel had moved to obtain the identities of all active superheroes, at which point virtually all members of the Justice Society retired. At this point in his life, as depicted in JSA #70, Pratt was engaged to Mary James, leading to their marriage at an undefined point in time (as confirmed by Justice Society of America: The Kingdom Special and others).

Later years
Pratt was revived with the rest of the team in 1963 in The Flash #137, and continued to make various appearances in the years that followed.

The Atom comic book, showcasing the adventures of Ray Palmer, brought the Atom of Earth-2 together with the Atom of Earth-1. Issue #29 (1967) depicts Al Pratt as living in Calvin City and as being a professor at Calvin College; he also possesses a modified automobile that transforms from an ordinary convertible to the Atomobile. In this story it is Ray Palmer who builds a "special dimensional vibrator" that allows travel between the two Earths. The villain in this adventure is The Thinker. In issue #36 (1968) Al Pratt is specifically named a professor of nuclear physics at Calvin College. Built into the belt of his Atom uniform is his own "atomic vibrator" which allows travel between the Earths. Al is depicted as a young-looking man who is "so busy as the Atom" that he "sort of let romance pass [him] by". Shown also are his friends Bill and Betty Roberts, as well as his first meeting with Marion Thayer on a double date. It is unknown what had happened to Marion Thayer, but in DC Comics Presents #30 (February 1981), Pratt's wife Mary resembles the blonde Thayer more than the brunette James.

The Atom's status with the Justice Society of America was as a reserve member up until after the formation of Infinity, Inc. Following the Crisis on Infinite Earths, the Last Days of the Justice Society Special (1986) told how Pratt, along with his teammates, prevented the unleashing of Ragnarök, a time-displaced and world-shattering event initiated by Adolf Hitler originally on April 12, 1945. To stave off the destruction of the world, Al and the others chose to enter a magical limbo - seemingly for all eternity.

The 1992 miniseries Armageddon: Inferno brought Al Pratt and the other members of the JSA back into the post-Crisis world. The short-lived series Justice Society of America (1992–1993) told the tale of the team's reintegration into society. Al was depicted as a short, stocky, balding man with radioactive, super-powered hands and a body aged to about 60 years or so. He was also written as a man more interested in training the next generation of heroes than "running off on crazy super-hero missions" (issue #2), though he still was hotheaded. It was revealed that Mary died while the JSA was trapped in the Ragnarok dimension, and that Al was naturally upset he never got to say goodbye. The series brought Al and the JSA into conflict with the Ultra-Humanite, Pol St. Germain, and Kulak the Sorcerer.

The Justice Society had been on active duty only briefly when 1994's Zero Hour miniseries depicted Al Pratt's murder by the temporal villain Extant, who increased his temporal rate, aging him to death.

Legacy
In the 1980s, Al Pratt's godson Al Rothstein was introduced; Rothstein was known as the superhero Nuklon (later changing his name to Atom Smasher), first appearing as a member of Infinity, Inc.

In 1994, it was revealed that Pratt had a son named Grant Emerson. Al Pratt was unaware of this - he had been told that there were complications with childbirth and that the child had not survived, but Al's wife was suffocated by the villain Vandal Savage, who kidnapped Grant and genetically altered him into a superbeing. After the onset of puberty, he became the superhero Damage. Damage later appeared in two incarnations of the Teen Titans, eventually joined the Freedom Fighters, and then became a member of the Justice Society of America, until his death during Blackest Night.

It was initially believed that the modern Manhunter Kate Spencer is his granddaughter. However, Kate is in fact the granddaughter of Phantom Lady and Iron Munro. Al Pratt allowed Sandra Knight (the Phantom Lady) to use his contact information to enter a home for unwed mothers, which led to the mix-up.

In the afterlife, the Atom also befriended the recently deceased Starman, David Knight. In dreams, David brought his brother, the next Starman, Jack Knight to a banquet in limbo attended by Atom and several other deceased mystery men.

In the Blackest Night crossover, Al Pratt was reanimated as a member of the Black Lantern Corps, to attack the Justice Society and his sons Damage and Atom Smasher.

DC Universe
In "DC Universe," a continuation of "DC Rebirth," the Prime Earth version of Atom was seen when John Stewart and Barry Allen go back in time and meet the Justice Society of America at the time when the Legion of Doom plotted to meddle with history.

In the pages of "Dark Nights: Death Metal," Al Pratt is revealed to be entombed in the Valhalla Cemetery. Batman later revived him with a Black Lantern Ring.

In the pages of "The New Golden Age", a flashback to 1940 as Atom among the Justice Society members partaking in a group photo. When Atom asks Doctor Fate if he will have children, Doctor Fate states that he'll have at least one. Upon the Helmet of Fate starting to heat up, Atom and Hawkman had to get it off of Doctor Fate. When a Huntress from a possible future ends up in 1940, Atom is among the Justice Society members that meet her. As Doctor Fate tries to read Huntress' mind about a threat in her time, Atom is among those that are knocked down by the magical feedback.

Powers and abilities
During his early days of crime fighting, Al Pratt possessed no metahuman qualities. Instead, he is a formidable boxer, expert physicist, and superb athlete. After being bombarded by Cyclotron's energies, Pratt gained immense strength, stamina, durability, and speed, as well as the ability to focus radioactive energy into a punch. In addition, the Atom has resistance to certain types of radiation. He also gained eternal youth after the battle with Ian Karkull.

Other versions

JSA: The Golden Age
In the Elseworlds story JSA: The Golden Age, Al Pratt was summoned by Tex Thompson for a test subject for the superhero of the atomic age project. He was rejected due to the nature of his atomic-based abilities which would've poisoned Adolf Hitler. Though Al was hired to work in the recruitment offices of Federal Bureau of Superheroes.

Justice Society Infinity
On Earth-2, Al Pratt is an active member of the Justice Society of America after it became the Justice Society Infinity alongside his godson Nuklon. The Justice Society Infinity had an encounter with Power Girl when she ended up on their world and Atom learned from her that his godson's counterpart went by the name Atom Smasher. Power Girl couldn't bring herself to let Atom know that her world's Al Pratt is dead.

Earth 2
In 2011, The New 52 rebooted the continuity of the DC Universe. Al was reintroduced in the Earth 2 ongoing series as a U.S. Sergeant. He was in charge of a squad carrying an atomic bomb meant to neutralize an Apokoliptian tower responsible for transporting Parademons to Earth. His squad however is attacked while en route to the tower and the bomb is detonated. Al is later found unharmed in the center of a giant hand print in the ground. Five years later, Al has become a captain in the World Army and is operating as a superhero codenamed "the Atom", wearing a costume similar to his son Damage while possessing the atomic energy powers of his original counterpart and the size-changing powers. Al is deployed as the Atom to take down Grundy who is rampaging across Washington DC. After dropping mid air from his transport, Al enlarges and lands on Grundy, ordering the Flash, Green Lantern, and Hawkgirl to stand down.

During the fight with Superman's clone Brutaal, Atom loses his right arm after helping Sandman evacuate some civilians.

After spending time in a medically-induced coma, Atom took part in one final mission. This mission involved him being dropped into a hole where he expanded it to create a cavern for Earth 2's survivors as the cost of his life. Once that was done, Atom shrunk back to his normal size before he died. The survivors honored his sacrifice by calling the location Atom's Haven.

In other media

Television
 An analogue named Tom Turbine appeared in the Justice League two-part episode "Legends", voiced by Ted McGinley. He is a homage to the Golden Age Atom, with whom he shares stature, color scheme, profession, features, and a similar power set, while also bearing elements of Golden Age Superman's facial features.
 Al Pratt / Atom appears in the Smallville two-part episode "Absolute Justice", portrayed by Glenn Hoffman. This version was a member of the Justice Society of America (JSA) from the 1970s and a physics professor at Calvin College before he was arrested during a student protest and framed for fraud by the government in a mission to take down the JSA. While Pratt was never convicted, he retired from heroics due to law enforcement being aware of his identity.

Film
Al Pratt appears in Black Adam, portrayed by Henry Winkler. This version is Albert Rothstein's uncle instead of his godfather and is a former member of the Justice Society who previously operated as Atom Smasher before passing the mantle to Rothstein.

Video games
Al Pratt / Atom appears in Scribblenauts Unmasked: A DC Comics Adventure.

References

All-American Publications characters
Comics characters introduced in 1940
DC Comics characters who can move at superhuman speeds
DC Comics characters with superhuman strength
DC Comics male superheroes
DC Comics metahumans
DC Comics military personnel
DC Comics scientists
Earth-Two
Fictional acrobats
Fictional boxers
Fictional characters from parallel universes
Fictional characters with nuclear or radiation abilities
Fictional characters with slowed ageing
Fictional characters with superhuman durability or invulnerability
Fictional physicists
Fictional United States Army personnel
Fictional World War II veterans
Golden Age superheroes